Max Kozloff (born 1933) is an American art historian, art critic of modern art and photographer. He has been art editor at The Nation, and Executive Editor of Artforum. His essay "American Painting During the Cold War" is of particular importance to the criticism on American Abstract Expressionism.

Kozloff received a Guggenheim Fellowship in 1968 and an Infinity Award for Writing from the International Center of Photography in 1990.

Early life and education
Kozloff was born in Chicago, Illinois. He graduated from the University of Chicago in 1953. Between 1954 and 1956 he served in the U.S. Army, before returning to the University of Chicago for his M.A. degree in 1958. He joined New York University's Institute of Fine Arts in 1959 to pursue a Ph.D. degree, and was subsequently awarded a Fulbright Fellowship for 1962–1963.

Career
He started his career with a teaching position at New York University (NYU), and  joined The Nation as art critic in 1961, where he worked until 1968, and Art International.

In 1964, he left NYU without a degree and began working at Artforum as an  associate editor. In 1965 he received an Ingram Merrill Foundation Fellowship, and in 1966, received the Frank Jewett Mather Award for art criticism from the College Art Association of America. He became Artforum'''s contributing editor in 1967 and rose up to become its executive editor between 1975 and 1977. Meanwhile in 1976, he became an art photographer, and in the following years held numerous shows and became a photography critic.

Kozloff has taught at several universities and institutions throughout his career. Some of his teaching activities include the University of Chicago's Downtown Center (1958-59), Cooper Union in New York (1959-60), Washington Square College at New York University (1960-61), and a workshop on Art Criticism for the American Federation of Arts in New York (1965).

Kozloff also taught at Queens College, City University of New York (1968-69), Indiana University (1970), California Institute of the Arts in Burbank (1971), the University of New Mexico in Albuquerque (1976 and 1985), and Yale University (1978 and 2005). In addition, he taught at the Chicago Art Institute (1981), Philadelphia College of Art (1983), University of California, San Diego (1984), University of California, Los Angeles (1988), and the School of Visual Art in New York's Masters Program in Photography and Related Media (1989-2000).

Personal life
Kozloff married the artist Joyce Blumberg in 1967.

In 1968, he signed the "Writers and Editors War Tax Protest" pledge, vowing to refuse tax payments in protest against the Vietnam War.

Publications
 Jasper Johns, Abrams, 1972.
 Cubism/Futurism (1973).
 Photography & fascination: Essays (1979).
 Leon Levinstein: the moment of exposure. National Gallery of Canada, 1995. .
 Cultivated Impasses: Essays on the Waning of the Avant-Garde, 1964–1975 (2000).
 New York: Capital of Photography (2002). .
 The Theatre of the Face: Portrait Photography Since 1900'' Phaidon, 2007. .

Awards
1968: Guggenheim Fellowship from the John Simon Guggenheim Memorial Foundation, New York City
1990: Infinity Award for Writing from the International Center of Photography, New York City

References

External links
Entry on Kozloff at Dictionary of Art Historians

American art historians
1933 births
Living people
Writers from Chicago
University of Chicago alumni
The Nation (U.S. magazine) people
American art critics
Jewish American historians
American male non-fiction writers
Photography academics
Photography critics
American photographers
American magazine editors
School of Visual Arts faculty
California Institute of the Arts faculty
New York University faculty
Frank Jewett Mather Award winners
American tax resisters
New York University Institute of Fine Arts alumni
Activists from California
Historians of photography
Historians from Illinois
21st-century American Jews